Tangerang Regency is a regency of Banten province, Indonesia. It is located on the island of Java. The current regent is Ahmed Zaki Iskandar.  Though commonly misunderstood as being a part of Jakarta, Tangerang is actually outside Jakarta City but is part of Greater Jakarta (which is called Jabodetabek, Tangerang being the "ta" of the acronym). Since 1993, the regency has lost territory as first Tangerang city was split off on 27 February 1993 and subsequently South Tangerang city was split off on 29 October 2008. The residual Regency now has an area of 959.61 km2 and a population of 2,834,376 at the 2010 census, growing to 3,245,619 at the 2020 census; the latest official estimate (for mid 2022) is 3,352,472 Tigaraksa is the regency seat.

Tangerang Regency is bounded by the Java Sea to the north, by Jakarta city, Tangerang city and South Tangerang city to the east, by Bogor Regency (in West Java) to the south, by a small section of Lebak Regency to the southwest, and by Serang Regency to the west.

Until 2008, Tangerang Regency was subdivided into 36 Districts, which were further divided into several villages and administrative villages, before the latest split when South Tangerang municipality was created; it now comprises 29 districts.

Administrative districts
Following the creation of the cities of Tangerang and South Tangerang from parts of the regency, the present Tangerang Regency now comprises the following 29 districts (kecamatan), tabulated below with their areas and their populations at the 2010 census and the 2020 census, and according to the latest official estimate (for mid 2022). The table also includes the number of administrative villages (rural desa and urban kelurahan) in each district, and its postal codes.

Notes: (a) except the village of Karangtengah, which has a post code of 15157. (b) including the offshore island of Pulau Betingan.

 [ The left-hand section of the table indicates the sixteen districts in Southwest Tangerang which would remain in a putative renamed "Tigaraksa Regency".  The right-hand section indicates the thirteen districts in North Tangerang seeking to secede to form a separate "North Tangerang Regency". ]

Splitting

Tangerang city was formed as an autonomous city on 27 February 1993 out of the Tangerang Regency. The city was previously an administrative city within that Regency.

On 27 October 2008, seven districts in the southern part of Tangerang Regency were cut out to form the South Tangerang autonomous city/municipality. They were Ciputat, Ciputat Timur (East Ciputat), Pamulang, Pondok Aren, Serpong, Serpong Utara (North Serpong) and Setu.

A proposal to set up a new North Tangerang Regency emerged in 2002 when a group of residents from the Mauk, Rajeg, Kemiri, Sepatan, Sepatan Timur, Sukadiri, Pakuhaji, Kosambi and Teluknaga districts decided their combined area had the potential to become a regency in its own right. In October 2011, thirteen districts expressed their interest in splitting from the regency and forming a new North Tangerang Regency. They are Sindang Jaya, Pasar Kemis, Kronjo, Mekar Baru, Kosambi, Teluknaga, Pakuhaji, Sepatan Timur (East Sepatan), Sepatan, Sukadiri, Mauk, Rajeg and Kemiri. These thirteen districts had a combined population of 1,473,470 at the 2020 census, rising to 1,527,617 at the official estimates for mid 2022.

After losing seven districts, which have formed into the newly established South Tangerang municipality, the Tangerang Regency administration is planning to divide three of the remaining 29 districts into six in the near future. "We have conducted a study on the regional division, and the results suggest the division of Rajeg, Pakuhaji and Teluknaga districts", Muhamad, administration affairs chief at the regional administration said in April 2010.

Tangerang Council chairman Dadang Kartasasmita has proposed the administration split the present regency into three: two regencies and one municipality. According to the proposal, Tigaraksa Regency would comprise 16 districts in the south and west of the existing regency, Pantura Regency along the northern coast would comprise nine districts and Cipasera Municipality would comprise four districts bordering Jakarta, areas where many commuters to the capital live.

References

External links

 Official site

{{Geographic Location (8-way)
 | Centre =Tangerang Regency
 | North =Java Sea
 | Northeast =Jakarta Bay
 | East =North Jakarta, Tangerang (city), South Tangerang (city)
 | Southeast =Bogor Regency
 | South = Bogor Regency
 | Southwest =Lebak Regency
 | West = Serang Regency
 | Northwest = Java Sea
 | image = 
}